James Douglas Patersonborn in Christchurch, New Zealand) is a former rugby union player with dual United States and New Zealand citizenship (born in New Zealand, mother is American). Paterson played Super Rugby for the Highlanders between 2010 and 2011. Paterson played for the United States at the 2011 Rugby World Cup.

Youth
Paterson's first introduction to rugby was in 1999 after returning from 8 years living in Budapest, Hungary where his father developed and directed an Agricultural Trading and Consultancy business. He returned to Christchurch, his home town and enrolled in Medbury Intermediate School where he played for the First XV. He then enrolled at Christchurch Boys' High School where he went on to play for the First XV in his 5th form (now known as Year 11).

After four years he was on the move again to Colorado, USA where he ended up playing high school football. Paterson impressed in a short period of time, achieving Colorado State recognition for the most running yards in a season as a Wide Receiver & Running Back. In the off season for football and prior to High School graduation from Pine Creek High School, Colorado Springs he along with his father, John, helped develop the Colorado Springs High School Rugby Club winning State in 2005. This team is now a frequent winner of the Colorado State High School State Championships.

In 2005 Paterson was selected for the USA U19 National Rugby team where he played in the U19 Rugby World Cup in South Africa, and the following year Captained the USA team at the U19 Rugby World Cup in Dubai.

Career
Paterson accepted a contract to the Canterbury Rugby Union – Crusaders in 2006 combined with a scholarship to the University of Lincoln College. He moved to Christchurch as a Crusaders wider training group team member. In 2007 he was selected for the New Zealand U21 team but suffered a minor knee injury so was unable to tour. Paterson played for the Canterbury NPC team for two seasons 2008 (one of the leading NPC try scorers) and 2009 collecting two NPC Championship titles. In 2009 he was named "One of five NZ's most promising players" in the 75th Jubilee of the NZ Rugby Almanack.

In 2010 Paterson accepted a contract to Super Rugby with the Highlanders. As part of the move south he also signed up with the Southland Stags in the newly named ITM rugby competition (Formally NPC). He spent two seasons with Southland and the Highlanders.

In 2012 Paterson decided to join his family international business based in Colorado Springs, Colorado, USA. When time permits he plays rugby for Glendale Raptors and for the Eagles. He underwent knee surgery for the second time in 2013 ruling him out of all Eagles assemblies until 2014.

Education

Primary schools
Greater Grace School of Budapest, Hungary
Medbury Intermediate School, Christchurch, New Zealand

Secondary schools
Christchurch Boys' High School
Pine Creek High School, Colorado Springs, Colorado, USA (2005 Graduate)

Universities
Colorado School of Mines, Golden, Colorado, USA
Lincoln College (2010 graduate in BA Commerce & Management)

References
Schools' rugby tradition filling Canterbury
TVNZ
http://www.planetnz.com/rugbyheads/board/index.php?action=printpage;topic=3424.0
http://www.stuff.co.nz/sport/667034
https://web.archive.org/web/20111004021613/http://www.crusaders.co.nz/news/fifth-addition-to-the-crusades-band-of-brothers/199/news.aspx
Magpie Rugby
James Paterson's southern move an easy one
Paterson pair quit Canterbury rugby
Google
http://www.stuff.co.nz/sport/rugby/opinion/2320369/Rebellious-spirit-in-Rugby-Almanack

External links
Highlanders Profile

1987 births
New Zealand rugby union players
Living people
Canterbury rugby union players
Southland rugby union players
Highlanders (rugby union) players
Rugby union players from Christchurch
Rugby union wings
New Zealand people of American descent
United States international rugby union players
People educated at Christchurch Boys' High School